The 2014 Open 13 was a men's tennis tournament played on indoor hard courts. It was the 21st edition of the Open 13, and part of the ATP World Tour 250 series of the 2014 ATP World Tour. It took place at the Palais des Sports in Marseille, France, from 17 February through 23 February 2014. Third-seeded Ernests Gulbis won the singles title.

Singles main-draw entrants

Seeds 

 Rankings were as of February 10, 2014.

Other entrants 
The following players received wildcards into the singles main draw:
  Kyle Edmund
  Thanasi Kokkinakis
  Albano Olivetti

The following players received entry from the qualifying draw:
  Ričardas Berankis
  Daniel Evans
  David Guez
  Ante Pavić

Withdrawals 
Before the tournament
  Tomáš Berdych
  Denis Istomin
  Jerzy Janowicz
  Łukasz Kubot
  Gaël Monfils
  Michał Przysiężny (back injury)
  Milos Raonic
  Stanislas Wawrinka

Doubles main-draw entrants

Seeds 

 Rankings were as of February 10, 2014.

Other entrants 
The following pairs received wildcards into the doubles main draw:
  Pierre-Hugues Herbert /  Albano Olivetti
  Lee Hsin-han /  Wang Chieh-fu
The following pair received entry as alternates:
  James Cerretani /  Adil Shamasdin

Withdrawals 
  Michaël Llodra (left groin injury)

Finals

Singles 

  Ernests Gulbis defeated  Jo-Wilfried Tsonga, 7–6(7–5), 6–4

Doubles 

  Julien Benneteau /  Édouard Roger-Vasselin defeated  Paul Hanley /  Jonathan Marray, 4–6, 7–6(8–6), [13–11]

References

External links 
 

Open 13
Open 13